Good witch may refer to:

White witch, a practitioner of folk magic for benevolent purposes
Locasta, the Good Witch of the North in the 1900 novel The Wonderful Wizard of Oz
Glinda, the Good Witch of the North in the 1939 film The Wizard of Oz
Good Witch (franchise), an American-Canadian media franchise of television films, series, and specials
The Good Witch, first film in the franchise
Good Witch (TV series), a television series in the franchise

See also
 The Good Witch of the West, a fantasy novel series
 Wendy the Good Little Witch, American comics character and comic book
 
 
 The Good Fairy (disambiguation)
 White Witch (disambiguation)
 Wicked Witch (disambiguation)